Alzoniella is a genus of minute freshwater spring snails, aquatic gastropod mollusks or micromollusks in the family Hydrobiidae.

All the species within the snail genus Alzoniella are crenobiotic, i.e. they are dependent on springs as a habitat.

Species 
The genus Alzoniella contains the following species:
Alzoniella asturica (Boeters & Rolán, 1988)
Alzoniella delmastroi Bodon & Cianfanelli, 2004
Alzoniella edmundi (Boeters, 1984)
Alzoniella finalina Giusti & Bodon, 1984
Alzoniella galaica (Boeters & Rolán, 1988)
Alzoniella hartwigschuetti (Reischütz, 1983)
Alzoniella iberopyrenaica Arconada, Rolán & Boeters, 2007
Alzoniella marianae Arconada, Rolán & Boeters, 2007
Alzoniella pellitica Arconada, Rolán & Boeters, 2007
Alzoniella pyrenaica Boeters, 1983
Alzoniella rolani (Boeters, 1986)
Alzoniella slovenica (Ložek & Brtek, 1964)

References 

 
Hydrobiidae
Taxonomy articles created by Polbot